Amsacta aureolimbata is a moth of the  family Erebidae. It is found in Angola, the Democratic Republic of Congo and Zambia.

References

Moths described in 1910
Spilosomina
Insects of the Democratic Republic of the Congo
Insects of Angola
Fauna of Zambia
Moths of Africa